The 2012 Al Habtoor Tennis Challenge was a professional tennis tournament played on outdoor hard courts. It was the fourteenth edition of the tournament which was part of the 2012 ITF Women's Circuit, offering a total of $75,000 in prize money. It took place in Dubai, United Arab Emirates, on 26 November–2 December 2012.

Singles entrants

Seeds 

 1 Rankings as of 19 November 2012

Other entrants 
The following players received wildcards into the singles main draw:
  Ons Jabeur
  Iva Mekovec
  Ksenia Palkina
  Conny Perrin

The following players received entry from the qualifying draw:
  Kristina Barrois
  Cristina Dinu
  Tara Moore
  Jasmina Tinjić

The following players received entry into the singles main draw as Lucky Losers:
  Alexandra Artamonova
  Danka Kovinić

The following player received entry by a Protected Ranking:
  Oksana Kalashnikova

The following player received entry by a Special Exempt:
  Samantha Murray

Champions

Singles 

  Kimiko Date-Krumm def.  Yulia Putintseva 6–1, 3–6, 6–4

Doubles 

  Maria Elena Camerin /  Vera Dushevina def.  Eva Hrdinová /  Karolína Plíšková 7–5, 6–3

External links 
 Official website
 2012 Al Habtoor Tennis Challenge at ITFtennis.com

2012 ITF Women's Circuit
2012 Al Habtoor Tennis Challenge
2012 in Emirati tennis